Louis Edward Carter (February 6, 1953 – October 11, 2020) was an American professional football player who was a running back in the National Football League (NFL). He played for the Oakland Raiders and the Tampa Bay Buccaneers. Born in Laurel, Maryland, he was a third round pick of the Raiders in 1975 having been the MVP of the Coaches' All-American college all-star game in his senior year at Maryland. He came to the Bucs in the veteran allocation draft of 1976 and became a valuable member of the Buc offense during its first three seasons as a running back and occasional receiver out of the backfield. He also threw the first TD pass in franchise history when he was stopped at the line of scrimmage in a game against the Seahawks and then lobbed the ball across the line to receiver Morris Owens for an unlikely one-yard score. He carried the ball 11 times for 27 yards in his rookie season in Oakland and also had two receptions for 29 yards, but never played again in the NFL after leaving Tampa Bay. After retiring from pro football, Carter sold cars for a dealership in Laurel, Maryland. When the dealership closed, Carter joined the security team at University of Maryland Global Campus, where he was a security coordinator.

Career stats

References

1953 births
2020 deaths
Players of American football from Maryland
American football running backs
Maryland Terrapins football players
Oakland Raiders players
Tampa Bay Buccaneers players
People from Laurel, Maryland